Xia, known in historiography as Hu Xia (胡夏), Northern Xia (北夏), Helian Xia (赫連夏) or the Great Xia (大夏), was a dynastic state of Xiongnu origin established by Helian Bobo during the Sixteen Kingdoms period in northern China. Prior to establishing the Xia, the imperial clan existed as a tribal entity known as the Tiefu.

Although the Xia only lasted from 407 to 431, its capital Tongwan situated in the Ordos Desert was a heavily fortified and state-of-the-art city that served as a frontier garrison until the Song dynasty. Its ruins were discovered during the Qing dynasty and can still be seen in present-day Inner Mongolia.

The Book of Wei also records that Liu Kuren's tribe, the Dugu, were descended from the Xiongnu. Yao Weiyuan (姚薇元) suggested in the past that 'Dugu' was an alternate form of 'Tuge' (屠各), the Xiongnu aristocratic clan that had adopted the Han Chinese surname of Liu (劉), members of which also ruled the Former Zhao state. This writer further suggests that 'Tuge' is an alternate form of 'Tuhe' (徒河), which is the branch of the Xianbei from which the Murong (慕容) were descended. The Liu (Dugu) were also known as 'Tiefu' (鐵弗), a term which meant that they had Xiongnu fathers and Xianbei mothers. Thus it is reasonable to say that the Dugu were at least half Xianbei.

All rulers of the Xia declared themselves "emperors".

Chieftains of the Tiefu and rulers of the Xia

Rulers family tree

See also
Xiongnu
Wu Hu
List of past Chinese ethnic groups
Tongwan
Xia Dynasty
Western Xia

References 

	

 
407 establishments
431 disestablishments
Dynasties in Chinese history
Former countries in Chinese history
5th-century establishments in China
5th-century disestablishments in China